Shahbaz Khan was a Pakistan Army officer. He served as the first director-general of the Inter-Services Public Relations (ISPR) directorate, from its founding in May 1949 to July 1952. He was succeeded in the post by commander Maqbool Hussain.

A colonel-ranking officer, Khan was described as a "keen bridge player" who frequented the Lahore Gymkhana Club.

References

Directors-General of the Inter-Services Public Relations
Pakistan Army officers
Year of birth missing
Year of death missing